Ted Koy (born September 15, 1947 in Bellville, Texas) is an American football former tight end for the Buffalo Bills and Oakland Raiders of the National Football League.  He was drafted out of the University of Texas by the Raiders in the 1970 NFL Draft. He was a part of the Longhorns' 1969 National Championship team, playing in the same offensive backfield (halfback) with James Street (quarterback), Steve Worster (fullback) and Jim Bertelsen (halfback). His brother Ernie Koy, Jr. also played with the Longhorns and in the NFL. His father Ernie Koy played Major League Baseball from 1938 through 1942 for five teams, and also played football at Texas.

References

1947 births
Living people
People from Bellville, Texas
American football tight ends
Texas Longhorns football players
Buffalo Bills players
Oakland Raiders players